Hostivít was the last of the seven Bohemian mythical princes between the (also mythical) founder of the Přemyslid dynasty Přemysl the Ploughman and the first historical prince Bořivoj. The names of the princes were first recorded in the Chronicle of Cosmas and then transmitted into historical books of the 19th century including František Palacký's The History of the Czech Nation in Bohemia and Moravia. According to tradition, he was the father of the non-legendary prince Bořivoj. Some historians suppose that when St. Ludmila was born, Hostivít (or Svatopluk I of Moravia) and Ludmila's father, Slavibor, contracted that Ludmilla would marry Bořivoj (which could refer to the wedding procession of an unknown bride mentioned in Annales Fuldenses for 871_. According to the Chronicle of Dalimil, Hostivít had a brother called Děpolt who inherited the land of Kouřim.

One theory about the number of the princes is propped on the frescoes on the walls of the Rotunda in Znojmo, Moravia but Anežka Merhautová claimed that the frescoes depict all the members of the Přemyslid dynasty including the Moravian junior princes.

Origin of the name 

Hostivít's name is thought to be derived from the old Slavonic words  meaning 'guests' and  meaning 'to welcome'. Záviš Kalandra thought the names of the seven princes were cryptical names of ancient Slavonic days of the week – Hostivít being the seventh, i.e. Saturday, when the guests are welcome. Another theory says that the names were mistaken from a coherent and partly interrupted old Slavonic text.

Seven mythical princes after Přemysl

See also 

 List of rulers of Bohemia

Notes 

Mythical Bohemian princes
Přemyslid dynasty
Fictional Czech people